Western Berezina or simply Berezina ( Zachodniaja Biarezina) is a river in Belarus, a right tributary of the river Neman.

Length is 226 km, basin area is approximately 4,000 km2.

The river rises near Maladechna. Its longest tributary is the Islach (102 km).

Notes

Rivers of Grodno Region
Rivers of Minsk Region
Rivers of Belarus